Nusantara Capital City Authority is a cabinet level-agency formed by Indonesian government, working directly under the President of Indonesia. The agency will become a special agency tasked with managing and governing the city of Nusantara, future capital of Indonesia located on East Kalimantan.

A third cabinet reshuffle of Onward Indonesia Cabinet was done on 10 March 2022, with both the Chairman and Vice Chairman of Nusantara Capital City Authority inaugurated at the reshuffle.

On 4 May 2022 the permanent constitution of the Authority, Presidential Regulation No. 62/2022 was published, formally establishing the Authority, although the date of the Decree backdated to 18 April 2022.

Powers 
According to the law on State Capital, the Authority executive office has power and will enjoy the status of a ministerial office, but with additional unique powers vested to the office. The executive office shall hold both executive power (similar to all provincial governors) and legislative power of a provincial regional representative council, hence no election for provincial governor or legislative body shall ever be held in the future new capital. The capital residents will only participate in three elections: presidential, senatorial, and congressional elections, different from other provinces who may participate up to seven elections. These privileges resulted with the future capital of Indonesia in a unique position among other provinces of Indonesia, even from existing special regions of Indonesia.

Not only that, based from the law, the executive office of the Authority even has power to appoint the candidates for Nusantara's representatives at People's Representative Council and Regional Representative Council through legalized deal enabled by the law and consultation with General Elections Commission, thus bypassing the requirement for political parties to send their cadres and setting them as political representatives in the lower house DPR or regional representatives in the upper house DPD.

Aside of the unique power given by the executive which combine the local executive and legislative function, the law also granted the executive office other powers in:

 Providing local investment licensing within Nusantara.
 Providing easiness for businesses within Nusantara.
 Providing special facilitation to parties which financially support the preparation, construction, and final move to the new capital.
 Providing development of Nusantara, its satellite cities, and surrounding areas.
 Managing finances and assets.
 Regulating and collecting its own local taxes imposed within Nusantara.
 Regulating land control, with special land rights and priority rights for purchasing land within Nusantara.
 Regulating environmental protection and management.
 Regulating disaster mitigation; and
 Implementing defense and security through integrated planning mechanisms as regulated through Nusantara Capital City Master Plan and the Strategic Plan for Nusantara Capital City National Strategic Area. For the defense and security affairs, it does not mean that the Authority having special forces under its control. The defense and security will still be provided by the central government, but its zonation determined by the Authority.

Organization 
On 4 May 2022, Presidential Regulation No. 62/2022 was enacted as the founding document of the Authority, though the regulation itself was backdated to 18 April 2022. As of 31 January 2023, the chairman, vice chairman, the Authority secretary, 3 deputies, head of Legal and Compliance Unit, and 10 directors and bureau heads have been appointed. The secretariat, deputies, as well as Legal and Compliance Unit are designated as the governing apparatus of the Authority, assigned to support the chairman and vice chairman in executing their duties. 

The structure of the Authority according to the Nusantara Capital City Authority Regulation No.1/2022 is as follows:

Executives 

 Chairman of the Nusantara Capital City Authority; and
 Vice Chairman of Nusantara Capital City Authority, whose main duties is to assist the chairman in executing their duties, filling for the chairman in their absence, and executing other duties as assigned.

Secretariat 
The Authority Secretariat, headed by a Secretary of the Authority, is tasked to coordinate Authority program implementation, to provide administrative guidance and support, as well as to handle the organizational administration of the Authority and its apparatus. To this end, the Secretariat is tasked to:

 Prepare for the Authority's program planning, budget, institutions, and resources
 Provide administrative guidance and support for the Authority management of human resources, finances, household affairs, archives, and documentations
 Manage the Authority's public relations, protocols, and security details
 Promote and foster forms of cooperation with the Authority
 Guide and manage the Authority organization and administration
 Manage various property, asset, and services that belonged to the State and/or the Authority, as well as its procurement.

The Secretariat is organized into several bureaus, as follow:

 Bureau of Planning, Organization, and Cooperations
 Bureau of Human Resources and Public Relations
 Bureau of General Affairs and Procurement
 Bureau of Finance, State-owned Properties, and Authority-controlled assets.

Deputies 
Seven Deputies are tasked to assist the Chairman and Vice Chairman of the Authority, specifically concerning Capital City preparation, development, construction, and relocation from Jakarta. They are composed of:

 Deputy for Planning and Agrarian Affairs
 Directorate of Macro Planning
 Directorate of Micro Planning
 Directorate of Agrarian Affairs
 Deputy for Development Monitoring
 Directorate of Governance Monitoring and Building Permit
 Directorate of Oversight, Monitoring, and Evaluation
 Directorate of Public Order
 Deputy for Socio-cultural and Community Empowerment
 Directorate of Basic Services
 Directorate of Community Empowerment
 Directorate of Culture, Tourism, and Creative Economy
 Deputy for Green and Digital Transformation
 Directorate of Development of Digital Ecosystem
 Directorate of Green Transformation
 Directorate of Data and Artificial Intelligence
 Deputy for the Environment and Natural Resources
 Directorate of the Environment and Disaster Management
 Directorate of Development and Utilization of Forestry and Water Resource
 Directorate of Food Security
 Deputy for Finance and Investment
 Directorate of Investment and Ease of Business
 Directorate of Funding
 Directorate of Finances
 Deputy for Facilities and Infrastructures
 Directorate of Basic Facilities and Infrastructures
 Directorate of Social Facilities and Infrastructures
 Directorate of Building, Zoning, and Urban Management.

Legal and Compliance Unit 
The Legal and Compliance Unit of Nusantara Capital City Authority, headed by a Unit Head, is tasked with providing the Authority with legal advice and advocacy, contract and legislation drafting, conducting internal supervision, coordinating compliance, violation prevention within the Authority.

The Unit is composed of several units, as follow:

 Directorate of Legal Affairs
 Directorate of Compliance
 Directorate of Supervision and Internal Audit

Advisory Staff 
The Chairman is allowed to have up to 5 advisors. They are tasked to advise the Chairman on matters relating to the administration of the Authority which is not previously handled by existing units.

Departments 
Although the Presidential Regulation or the Authority has yet to establish any specific institutions to provide public service to the city, it did specifically mention several matters relating to the provision of city public services and infrastructures. These matters may be run by particular departments, in order to provide and regulate technical need of the future city autonomously, rather than to rely on the Central Government.

These are the following hypothetical departments, according to Article 3(2)(w) of the Presidential Regulation, as well as to Article 3(w) of the Authority Regulation:

 Department of Housing and Settlements
 Department of Solid Waste Management
 Department of Wastewater Management
 Department of Clean Water Management
 Department of Public and Social Facilities, presumably concerning parks and places of worship
 Department of Mobility and Connectivity, presumably concerning public transports
 Department of Energy
 Department of Information and Communication Technology
 Department of Health
 Department of Education
 Department of Manpower

Advisory board 
The Presidential Regulation which founded the Authority, also allowed for the formation of a Nusantara Capital City Authority Advisory Board by the President. The Advisory Board is not part of the Authority, which means that it does not have any governing role. As its name points out, it may only have advisory role within the administration of Nusantara.

It is yet to be known whether the board will have legislative powers alongside the Head of the Authority, as it has yet to be formed by the President.

History

Formation 

The idea of moving Indonesia's national capital away from Java had been around for decades. In 2019 during the Widodo Administration, the plan to seriously move the center of power was put forward and announced to the public in a televised speech. During the annual 16 August address in 2019, in the presence of the People's Consultative Assembly, the president then officially inquired the two houses of the legislature for their support in the new capital initiative.

On 18 January 2022, the People's Representative Council (or DPR, the lower house of Indonesian legislature) passed the 2022 State Capital Act, with the future capital named Nusantara.  All factions in the house supported the passing of the bill into law except PKS, who questioned the necessity of moving the national capital in the middle of COVID-19 Pandemic.

The capital will be governed by Nusantara Capital City Authority, governed by a Head and a Deputy Head, directly answerable to the President as a cabinet-level official. Meanwhile, the formation of the Authority, the appointment of officials, and the transfer of assets and personnel to Nusantara will happen following the issuance of relevant regulations.

Early leadership candidates 
Four people were reported to have "higher probability" for the candidate:
 Abdullah Azwar Anas: former Regent of Banyuwangi Regency (2010-2015, 2016–2021).
 Basuki Tjahaja Purnama: current President Commissioner of Pertamina (2019–present), former Governor of Jakarta (2014-2017), former Deputy Governor of Jakarta (2012-2014), and former Regent of East Belitung (2005-2006).
 Bambang Brodjonegoro: former Ministry of Research and Technology (2019-2021), head of the National Research and Innovation Agency (2019-2021), Minister of National Development Planning (2016-2019), and Minister of Finance (2014-2016).
 Tumiyana: current Chief Commissioner of Jakarta-Bandung high-speed railways project.
In addition, on 20 January 2022 President Widodo expressed his intention to set an architect and had experience in regional managing and governing as future CEO of the Authority. Currently, a few of people which met the criteria also added as candidates of the CEO position.
 Ridwan Kamil: architect, former mayor of Bandung, and current governor of West Java. 
 Tri Rismaharini: architect and urban planner, former mayor of Surabaya, and current Minister of Social Affairs.
 Danny Pomanto: former architecture lecturer of Hasanuddin University, and current mayor of Makassar.
On 29 January 2022, the ruling party PDI-P, officially endorsed Basuki Tjahaja Purnama as candidate of the future CEO of Nusantara. Despite the official endorsement, the party stated that they would leave the choice up to the President. In addition to the endorsement of Purnama, PDI-P also officially confirmed its cadres as future CEO candidates aside of Purnama, Tri Rismaharini, Abdullah Azwar Anas, and Hendrar 'Hendri' Prihadi (the latter is the current mayor of Semarang).

Due to lack of Kalimantan politicians or officials or political figures as candidate of the post, local representative from South Kalimantan Regional Representative Council voiced concerns, as potentially the post might ignore any representation of local Kalimantan people. In response of the lack of native Kalimantan figures in the candidacies, on 15 February 2022 representatives of East Kalimantan locals, promoted their favored local candidates:

 Aji Muhammad Arifin, Sultan of Kutai Kartanegara, which presently become Kutai Kartanegara Regent; and 
 Aji Muhammad Jarnawi, Sultan of Paser Sultanate, which presently become Penajam North Paser Regent.

Both sultans are deemed as local figures respected by East Kalimantan people. Their names were sent to Jakarta to become the candidates of Nusantara CEO and Vice CEO for the President's consideration.

On 22 February 2022, Joko Widodo announced his own favored candidate for the executives. While he did not mentioned the name, his revelation of additional criteria of independent non-partisan expert for the office made the previous candidate names become unlikely. At the same time from Joko Widodo announcement, a new name was leaked to the press from unnamed officials that Bambang Susantono, former Vice Minister of Transportation during Second United Indonesia Cabinet (2009-2014) and the Vice President for Knowledge Management and Sustainable Development of the Asian Development Bank became the strongest possible candidate for the office holder. Reportedly Bambang Susantono who was the second choice candidate became front runner, after the first, Basuki Tjahaja Purnama turned down the offer from Joko Widodo.

On 9 March 2022 it was announced that Bambang Susantono and Dhony Rahajoe (managing director of the President Office in Sinar Mas Land) will be inaugurated as Head and Deputy Head of the Capital City Authority, and finally inaugurated on 10 March 2022.

Transition process 
On 5 May 2022, Inter-ministerial Transition Team is activated thru State Minster Decree No. 105/2022. The Inter-ministerial Transition Team is tasked to provide support for the acceleration of preparation, development, and relocation of the State Capital. The team also tasked for supervising and garnering active role from the elements of the relevant ministries/institutions involved in the capital relocation process.

Activation 
On 13 October 2022, the Authority formally activated with inauguration of some officers and deputies.

Governance

Chairman of the Authority 
The Chairman of the Authority also serves as the head of Nusantara Special Capital Region. The office is a cabinet-level office equal to a minister, which means the Chairman and the Authority is directly responsible to the president. As with most cabinet-level office, the appointment require prior consultation with the People's Representative Council. 

The Chairman will serve for a five-year term, can be reappointed for another term, and can be dismissed during their term in office:

Vice Chairman of the Authority 
The office is equal to a deputy minister, which means the Vice Chairman is also directly responsible to the president. The appointment require prior consultation with the People's Representative Council, despite the office of Vice Chairman is not a cabinet-level official.

The Vice Chairman will serve for a five-year term, can be reappointed for another term, and can be dismissed during their term in office.

Criticisms 
Indonesian political scientists were alarmed due to the nature and power given to the Authority as institution and vas power is hold by the executives, and criticized the form since the bill under was discussion. Indonesian political scientists fear that with such large power given by the agency and the executives will lead into formation of "local autocracy" within Indonesia democracy.

On 2 February 2022, a group of citizens filed a constitutional review request to the Constitutional Court. They questioned the need and the legality of the Act, which was promulgated in a speedy manner in the middle of COVID-19 pandemic, as well as the constitutionality of having a capital region directly governed by the central government via the Authority.

National Research and Innovation Agency political researcher Wasisto Raharjo Jati commented, with such power and prestige hold by the Authority, the CEO post is very promising for politicians and there is a chance for the politicians use it as stepping stone for presidency.

Elements within the central government bureaucracy had voiced their reluctance to be transferred to the new capital, with some asked to be transferred to Jakarta local government instead, and thus stay in Jakarta.

References 

Government agencies of Indonesia
2022 establishments in Indonesia